Goodbye & Amen is a 1978 Italian  film. It stars  Claudia Cardinale, Tony Musante and John Forsythe in the leading roles.

Cast
Tony Musante: John Dhannay
Claudia Cardinale:	Aliki
John Forsythe: USA ambassador
John Steiner: Donald Grayson
Renzo Palmer: Parenti
Angela Goodwin: ambassador wife
Anna Zinnemann: Renata
Fabrizio Jovine: Moreno
Wolfango Soldati: Harry Lambert
Alessandro Haber: Blondie

References

External links

1978 films
1970s Italian-language films
English-language Italian films
1970s English-language films
Films about the Central Intelligence Agency
Films directed by Damiano Damiani
Italian political thriller films
Films scored by Guido & Maurizio De Angelis
1970s political thriller films
1970s Italian films